Valerie Isobel Marie Young  (née Sloper, born 10 August 1937) is a former athlete from New Zealand. She competed at the 1958, 1962, 1966, and 1974 Commonwealth Games, and won seven medals in the shot put and discus throw. She retired after the 1966 games to have a family, but went back into training when the 1974 Games were allocated to Christchurch. She also competed at the 1956, 1960, and 1964 Summer Olympics, and went to the 1976 and 1984 games as an official (chaperone). She placed fourth in the shot put in 1960 and 1964, and fifth in 1956.

Young won the most gold medals (5) of any New Zealand competitor at the Commonwealth Games. At the national level, she has won more New Zealand titles, 37, than any other athlete, including 18 in the discus and 17 in the shot put. She also won the pentathlon title twice, in 1958 and 1963.

In the 1987 New Year Honours, Young was appointed an Officer of the Order of the British Empire, for services to athletics.

References

Further reading
 Athletes at the Games by John Clark, pages 155–158 (1998, Athletics New Zealand)

External links

 
 
 Page with Photo at Sporting Heroes

1937 births
Living people
New Zealand female shot putters
New Zealand female discus throwers
Commonwealth Games gold medallists for New Zealand
Commonwealth Games silver medallists for New Zealand
Commonwealth Games bronze medallists for New Zealand
Commonwealth Games medallists in athletics
Olympic athletes of New Zealand
Athletes (track and field) at the 1956 Summer Olympics
Athletes (track and field) at the 1960 Summer Olympics
Athletes (track and field) at the 1964 Summer Olympics
Athletes (track and field) at the 1958 British Empire and Commonwealth Games
Athletes (track and field) at the 1962 British Empire and Commonwealth Games
Athletes (track and field) at the 1966 British Empire and Commonwealth Games
Athletes (track and field) at the 1974 British Commonwealth Games
Sportspeople from Ashburton, New Zealand
New Zealand Officers of the Order of the British Empire
Medallists at the 1962 British Empire and Commonwealth Games
Medallists at the 1966 British Empire and Commonwealth Games
Medallists at the 1958 British Empire and Commonwealth Games
Medallists at the 1974 British Commonwealth Games